Give Us This Day is an Australian religious television short program aired from 1956 to 1958 on TCN-9. It is significant as one of the very earliest Australian-produced television programs. It was among the television shows aired during the first "official" week of television in Sydney. Give Us This Day was a live six-minute religious program in which a minister gave a short speech, with ministers from different Christian denominations appearing during the show's run. There was no recurring cast. It was based on a British format.

While largely forgotten today, it actually out-lived three 1956 TCN series debuts that are more commonly mentioned in television retrospectives – The Johnny O'Connor Show, Campfire Favourites and Accent on Strings. TCN-9's other 1956 series debuts included Fun Farm (1956–1957), The Home Show (1956–1957) and What's My Line (1956–1958).

References

External links
 

1956 Australian television series debuts
1958 Australian television series endings
Black-and-white Australian television shows
English-language television shows
Religious television series
Australian live television series